Ivair Nogueiro do Pinho (6 November 1951 – 31 March 2021) was a Brazilian politician, civil engineer, and businessman.

Biography
He first served as Deputy Mayor of Betim from 1989 to 1990 before becoming Mayor, serving from 1991 to 1992. He was then elected to the Legislative Assembly of Minas Gerais, where he served from 1995 to 2011, although he left his post from 1 January 1999 to 30 March 2000 to serve as Secretary of State for Sports in the cabinet of Itamar Franco.

Ivair Nogueiro do Pinho died of COVID-19 in Belo Horizonte on 31 March 2021 at the age of 69.

References

1951 births
2021 deaths
20th-century Brazilian politicians
21st-century Brazilian politicians
Mayors of places in Brazil
Members of the Legislative Assembly of Minas Gerais
Brazilian Democratic Movement politicians
Deaths from the COVID-19 pandemic in Minas Gerais